Dušan Otašević (born 1940) is a Serbian artist.

Biography
Otašević was born in Belgrade in what was then the Kingdom of Yugoslavia.  He graduated from the Academy of Fine Arts, Belgrade in 1966. At first he was associated with "New Figuration" in Belgrade, turned to Pop-Art and produced sculptural objects. He currently lives in Belgrade.

Solo exhibitions and participations (selection):
1966 "New Figuration of Belgrade Circle", Gallery of the Cultural Centre, Belgrade.
1967 Gallery in the House of the Rising Generation, Belgrade.
1984 "Line", Gallery Sebastian, Belgrade.
1990 "Ilija Dimić", Gallery Sebastian, Belgrade.
1995 "Portrait", Gallery SANU, Belgrade.

References

Serbian painters
Members of the Serbian Academy of Sciences and Arts
Artists from Belgrade
1940 births
Living people